The 1964–65 Marquette Warriors men's basketball team represented Marquette University during the 1964–65 men's college basketball season. It was Al McGuire's first season as head coach.

Roster

Schedule

Statistics
Tom Flynn 16.5 ppg
Paul Carbins 11.7 ppg

References

Marquette Golden Eagles men's basketball seasons
Marq
Marq
1964–65 NCAA University Division men's basketball independents season